The BMW E24 is the first generation of BMW 6 Series range of grand tourer cars, which was produced from January 1976 to 1989 and replaced the BMW E9 coupé.

The E24 was produced solely in a 2-door coupé body style. All models used petrol straight-six engines, with the majority (aside from the M635CSi/M6 model) using a version of the BMW M30 engine family. The E24 was initially based on the E12 5 Series platform, until it switched to the newly released E28 5 Series platform in 1982.

The M635CSi is the first of the BMW M6 model line and is powered by the M88/3 straight-six engine. In North America, the vehicle is badged as "M6" and uses the less powerful BMW S38 engine.

The E24's successor, the E63 6 Series, was released in 2004 after a 16-year hiatus. Although the E31 8 Series was released as production of the E24 was ending, the 8 Series is considered a separate model line and therefore not a successor to the E24.

Development and production 
The E24 was designed by Paul Bracq. Unlike its E9 predecessor, the body of the E24 has a B pillar. The initial proposal for the E24 was  based on a BMW E9 3.0 CS with an increased height, in order to make it easier for customers to enter and exit the vehicle. However, Bob Lutz rejected the proposal, eventually leading to the shape of the E24 in its production form.

Production started in January 1976 with the 630CS and 633CSi in February 1976. A total of 86,216 cars were built prior to production ending in April 1989.

Originally the bodies were manufactured by Karmann, but production was later taken in-house to the BMW Group Plant Dingolfing. Early series one E24s in original condition are now quite rare, particularly Karmann assembled cars (look for the Karmann build plate in the left door frame) produced before August 1977.

Engines 

Figures are for European specification models, with U.S. market figures in the footnotes.

Transmissions 
Initially, the E24 was available with a 4-speed manual transmission (Getrag 262), a 5-speed manual transmission (Getrag 265), or a 3-speed automatic transmission (ZF 3HP22).

In 1983 the automatic transmission was upgraded to a 4-speed ZF 4HP22.

Suspension and steering 
Front suspension consists of MacPherson struts and the rear suspension is independent semi-trailing arms. In 1982, the front suspension was upgraded to include twin-pivot lower control arms and the geometry of the rear suspension was revised.

The steering uses a recirculating ball system with power assistance.

M635CSi / M6 model 

The M635CSi model, introduced at the Frankfurt Motor Show in 1983, is the first in the line of M6 models. In 1987, the equivalent model for the North American (U.S. and Canada) market was introduced and badged simply 'M6'.

The M635CSi is powered by a  version of the BMW M88/3 straight-six engine. The North American M6 vehicle is powered by the detuned   version of the BMW S38 straight-six engine, which has a lower compression ratio and uses a catalytic converter.

Over its production run from 1983 through 1989, 5,855 /M6 cars were built, 1,767 of which were for the North American market, and 524 right hand drive cars for the United Kingdom.

Yearly changes

1976 
The new 6 Series coupé, using the model code E24, was introduced to the press in March 1976, suggesting production commenced in 1975.

Initially there where two models available: 630 CS and 633 CSI. Karmann constructed the 6 series coupé, as well as the earlier BMW coupés. There were a total of 1665 units of the 630 CS (plus 410 630 CSi, bound for the United States) and 2858 units of the 633 CSi (this number also includes right-hand drive cars) produced in the first year, amongst a total of 4,933 cars produced for the year.

1977 
Production of E24 continued in 1977 at Karmann as a complete assembly until August, when only the steel body shell was made by Karmann and then shipped to BMW's plant in Dingolfing for assembly.

Karmann-bodied cars are now rare and highly collectable, particularly in original condition in early factory colours such as orange (028 Phönix), green (079 Mitgrün), and yellow (070 Golf) - the later very rare.

1978 
In July 1978, the more powerful 635CSi variant was introduced. The 635CSi featured a close-ratio 5-speed gearbox and a single piece black rear spoiler. The aerodynamic changes reduced uplift at high speeds by almost 15 percent over the other E24 models.

1979 
In 1979 the carburetted 630CS was replaced with the 628CSi; this car had a fuel-injected 2.8L engine taken from the E12 528i. An anti-lock braking system became available as an option.

1980 
In 1980, the fuel-injection systems changed from Bosch L-jetronic to Bosch Motronic. The 635CSi central locking system could now be operated from the passenger door and trunk.

1982 facelift 

In 1982 (model year 1983 in the US), the E24 platform changed from the E12 5 Series to the E28 5 Series, resulting changes to exterior styling, engines, chassis, suspension, electronics and the interior. The struts in the new front suspension were double-linked ones, making the car less likely to dip under hard braking. The new rear axle was nearly identical to the trailing arm layout of the E28 528i, with a new pitman arm to control camber changes. Meanwhile, the ventilated rear discs had proven a needless complication and were replaced with solid ones. The rust protection was improved considerably along with the facelift.

The 635CSi engine was updated to the  M30B34, which used a smaller bore and longer stroke than the previous  M90 engine. The 635CSi became available with a wide-ratio 5-speed manual or a 4-speed automatic transmission.

1987 
E24s produced after June 1987 were fitted with ellipsoid headlamps, as per the recently introduced E32 7 Series. The front and rear bumpers and spoilers were redesigned to use a single design worldwide (prior to this, models sold in North America used a different design from the rest of the world).

North American and Japanese models 

Although other markets offered multiple E24 models, in North America only one model was available at any given time (aside from the M6).

630CSi 
The 6 series was released in the US as the 630CSi in March 1977, with the 633CSi replacing it during the 1978 model year. The US market version received larger bumpers and side marker lights, as required by federal legislation. The 630CSi is powered by a fuel-injected version of the 630CS engine.

633CSi 
The 633CSi arrived in USA in September 1977 (for the 1978 model year), replacing the original 630. In United States/Japan specification, the 633CSi was powered by a  version of the M30B32 engine.

In September 1980 (1981 model year), the manual transmission for US cars was upgraded from a 4-speed to a 5-speed. A 3-speed automatic transmission was optional.

In September 1982, North American and Japanese market models received a major facelift, as per the models sold in the rest of the world.

635CSi 

In November 1984, for the 1985 model year, the 633CSi was replaced by the 635CSi for the North American Market. An L6 "luxury edition" version of the 635CSi was available in North America for the 1987 model year. The L6 featured leather headliner and trim and an automatic gearbox.

In 1988, the engine was upgraded to the M30B35. This engine has a capacity of 3.4 Litres (despite the model code and the "3.5" inscribed on the intake manifold) and produces  and  torque. This upgraded engine resulted in catalytic converter equipped United States models offering similar performance to European models. Self-leveling rear suspension was added to the 635CSi and M6 features list.

M6 

In 1987, North America and Japan received their equivalent of the M635CSi, called simply the M6. The main difference between the M6 and its European counterpart, is that the S38 engine is used instead of the M88. Compared with the M88, the S38 has a catalytic converter, the compression ratio reduced to 9.8:1, a double row timing chain, a shorter camshaft duration and a simplified exhaust manifold.

Standard equipment on the United States market M6 cars included many features which were optional on the European cars, including heated power seats, self-leveling rear suspension, beverage chiller (cooled by an air-conditioning system) between the rear seats, air-conditioning vents for rear seat occupants, sunshade for rear occupants and an 8 speaker premium sound system.

Motorsport 

In 1982, the European Touring Car Championship transitioned to Group A regulations, prompting BMW to move from the 3.0 CSL to the 635 CSi. BMW Motorsport produced approximately 50 competition chassis between 1983 and 1985.

Achievements in championships and series:
 European Touring Car Championship (Group A); 3 titles (1981, 1983 and 1986)
 Deutsche Tourenwagen Meisterschaft; 1 title (1984)
 Belgian Touring Car Championship (Group N); 1 title (1984)
 Australian Touring Car Championship; 1 title (1985)
 Australian Endurance Championship; 2 titles (1985 and 1986)
 Australian Manufacturers' Championship; 1 title (1985)
 AMSCAR Series; 1 title (1985)
 European Hill Climb Championship; 1 title (1985)
 New Zealand Touring Car Championship; 2 titles (1985 and 1987)
 New Zealand Benson & Hedges Saloon Car Series; 1 title (1985)
 Nissan-Mobil 500 Series (New Zealand); 1 title (1985)
 Japanese Touring Car Championship; 1 titles (1985)

Race wins:
 RAC Tourist Trophy; 2 wins (1980 and 1984)
 4h/500 km of Monza; 3 wins (1980, 1981 and 1983)
 Guia Race; 1 win (1983)
 Spa 24 Hours; 3 wins (1983, 1985 and 1986)
 24 Hours Nürburgring; 2 wins (1984 and 1985)
 Sandown 500; 1 win (1985)

References

Cars introduced in 1976
1980s cars
6 Series (E24)